HOT Animation was a British animation studio owned by HIT Entertainment that specialized in stop motion animation. It was established on 1 April 1998 by Jackie Cockle, Brian Little, and Joe Dembinski.

They started with producing the later four episodes of Brambly Hedge, a series of 25-minute episodes based on the eight illustrated children's books by Jill Barklem.

Their worldwide success did not follow until the creation of Bob the Builder, a British animated television series which follows construction builder Bob and the Can-Do-Crew of building vehicles. The theme tune was released as a single, "Can We Fix It?" with an accompanying promo produced at HOT, which beat Kylie Minogue's "Please Stay", Eminem's "Stan", and Westlife's "What Makes a Man" to become the Christmas number-one single.

The company then made Rubbadubbers, a series about bath toys that come alive. Pingu, a Swiss-British animated series about a family of penguins, was recreated with great success from 2003 to 2006.

HOT ceased to produce the main series of Bob the Builder after 2008 when the studio announced that jobs would be cut, and opted to produce a direct-to-DVD series called Bob the Builder: On Site, using stop motion from Bob's world and live action from real world construction sites.

On 18 August 2012, the studio permanently closed, years before HIT was purchased by Mattel in 2016.

Productions

Television
 Brambly Hedge (1998–2000, episodes 5–8 only)
 Bob the Builder (1999–2008, seasons 1–16 only)
 Rubbadubbers (2003–2005)
 Pingu (2003–2006, seasons 5–6 only)

Feature-length specials
 Bob the Builder: A Christmas to Remember (2001)
 Bob the Builder: The Live Show (2002)
 Bob the Builder: The Knights of Can-a-Lot (2003)
 Bob the Builder: Snowed Under - The Bobblesburg Winter Games (2004)
 Bob the Builder - Project Build It: When Bob Became a Builder (2005)
 Bob the Builder - Project Build It: Built to Be Wild (2006)
 Bob the Builder - Project Build It: Scrambler to the Rescue (2007)
 Bob the Builder - Project Build It: Race to the Finish (2008)

Direct-to-home video 
 Bob the Builder: On Site (2008–2011)

Music videos 
 "Can We Fix It?" (2000)
 "Mambo No. 5" (2001)
 "Eskimo Disco 7-11" (2006)
 "Big Fish, Little Fish" (2008)

Other 
 Dinosaur Roar (1999, pilot for HIT Entertainment)
 Gina and Stella (2001, short film)
 Bitziboos (2004, pilot for HIT Entertainment)
 Life on Mars (2007, Camberwick Green parody sequence for Series 2 Episode 5)

External links
 Official website (archived)

Stop motion animators
British animation studios
Defunct companies based in Manchester
British companies established in 1998
Mass media companies established in 1998
Mass media companies disestablished in 2012
HIT Entertainment